Sphinx poecila, the poecila sphinx, is a moth of the family Sphingidae. It is found from Newfoundland and Maine south to Pennsylvania and west to Michigan, northeastern Illinois and Wisconsin.

The wingspan is 68–95 mm.

The larvae feed on Rosa carolina, Picea glauca, Larix laricina and Alnus, Malus, Myrica and Vaccinium species.

References

External links
Species info

Moths of North America
Moths described in 1828
Sphinx (genus)